Albert William Rubeling (May 10, 1913 – January 28, 1988) was an American professional baseball third baseman. He played in Major League Baseball (MLB) for the Philadelphia Athletics and Pittsburgh Pirates. He attended Towson University and is a member of the institution's Athletic Hall of Fame. Rubeling had the most pinch hitting at bats in the National League during the  season. He was born in Baltimore, Maryland and died there at the age of 74.

References

External links

Major League Baseball third basemen
Baseball players from Baltimore
Philadelphia Athletics players
Pittsburgh Pirates players
Syracuse Chiefs players
Towson Tigers baseball players
1913 births
1988 deaths